The play-offs of the 2022 Billie Jean King Cup Europe/Africa Zone Group I were the final stages of the Group I zonal competition involving teams from Europe/Africa. Using the positions determined in their pools, the eleven teams faced off to determine their placing in the 2022 Billie Jean King Cup Europe/Africa Zone Group I. The top three teams advanced to the 2022 Billie Jean King Cup Play-offs, while the bottom two teams were relegated to Europe/Africa Zone Group II for 2023.

Pool results

1st place play-off 
The first-placed teams of each pool played against each other in a head-to-head round. As both teams finished first in their pools, they automatically advance to the 2022 Billie Jean King Cup Play-offs, but played-off for ranking points.

Hungary vs. Slovenia

Promotion play-off 
The second-placed teams of each pool played against each other in a head-to-head round. The winner of the tie advanced to the 2022 Billie Jean King Cup Play-offs, alongside Hungary and Slovenia.

Serbia vs. Croatia

5th place play-off 
The third-placed teams of each pool played against each other in a head-to-head round to determine the nation finishing 5th.

Austria vs. Turkey

Relegation play-offs 
The second-last and last-placed teams of each pool played against one another in a head-to-head round. The losers of each tie were relegated to Europe/Africa Zone Group II in 2023.

Denmark vs. Georgia

Estonia vs. Sweden

Final placements 

References

External links 
 Fed Cup website

2022 Billie Jean King Cup Europe/Africa Zone